Taurovenator is a medium-sized carcharodontosaurid theropod from the late Cretaceous of Argentina. Discovered by Matias Motta in 2005 and formally described in 2016, it is represented by an isolated right postorbital.

Etymology 
The tauro~ prefix in the generic name Taurovenator comes from the Latin taurus, meaning "bull", and venator meaning "hunter". The specific name honors Enzo Violante, the owner of the Violante farm where the animal was discovered.

Discovery 
The remains of Taurovenator were discovered in a layer of the Huincul Formation on the Violante Farm, southeast of the Ezequiel Ramos-Mexía Lake, Río Negro Province, Argentina, by Matías Motta in 2005. Taurovenator was found alongside the megaraptoran Aoniraptor and indeterminate remains of other Carcharodontosauridae, as well as abelisauroids and Paraves. This diverse assemblage of theropods was part of the Huincul Formation in Neuquén Province. They shared this environment with Mapusaurus, Argentinosaurus, Skorpiovenator and Ilokelesia. It has been suggested that Taurovenator is synonymous with Mapusaurus.

See also 
 2016 in paleontology

References 

Carcharodontosaurids
Cenomanian life
Turonian life
Late Cretaceous dinosaurs of South America
Cretaceous Argentina
Fossils of Argentina
Huincul Formation
Fossil taxa described in 2016